The following are lists of episodes from the Shameless series:

 List of Shameless (British TV series) episodes, a British comedy-drama series
 List of Shameless (American TV series) episodes, an American remake